Floida Kërpaçi is an Albanian politician, member of the Socialist Movement for Integration (Albanian: Lëvizja Socialiste për Integrim, LSI). Kerpaci is currently the Chairwoman of Youth Movement for Integration (Albanian: Lëvizjes Rinore për Integrim, LRI).

Kerpaci was born on May 17, 1994 in Saranda, Albania. Since 2013, she has been studying at the University of Medicine, Tirana, Faculty of Pharmacy.

Politics
After various engagements in youth organizations, she started her political career in 2012, joining the Youth Movement for Integration. 
Kërpaçi has served as member of the Tirana City Council for 2 years, elected for the first time in the local elections of 2015. 
In June 2016, she was elected Chairwoman of the Youth Movement for Integration. 
Mrs. Kërpaçi is a member of the National Committee and Leadership of the Socialist Movement for Integration since June 2016. 
In December 2016, she was elected Chairwoman of the Alliance of Young Councilors in the Municipality of Tirana.
Kërpaçi is currently serving as Member of Parliament, in the Albanian Parliament, elected in the general elections the country held on June 25, 2017.

References
4. http://www.parlament.al/Anetar/Details/1216

1994 births
Living people
Socialist Movement for Integration politicians
21st-century Albanian women politicians
21st-century Albanian politicians